Mingyuan Hu is a British historian of art and literature.

Hu read Classics, Philosophy, and Art History at the University of Glasgow and received the Herkless Prize in 2008. From the same university she received her PhD in Literary History. She was Lecturer in Art Histories of Asia at the University of Leeds, and is Research Associate at the Humboldt-Universität zu Berlin.

Selected works
Monographs
 Fou Lei: An Insistence on Truth (Brill, 2017) 
 Late Roses and Early Snow (Hermits United, 2022) 
 Mnemosyne (Hermits United, 2022) 
Translation
 Toward Bravery and Other Poems (Hermits United, 2017; 2022) by Mu Xin ; 
 Oratory and Democracy in China: four dialogues from the Annals of the Warring States. (Hermits United, 2022)

References

External links

Living people
Year of birth missing (living people)
Place of birth missing (living people)
British people of Chinese descent
Alumni of the University of Glasgow
Academic staff of the Humboldt University of Berlin
Academics of the University of Leeds
21st-century British historians
British women historians